Quezon Science High School (QSHS, QueScie or Quesay) is the provincial secondary Science High School of Quezon, located along the diversion road of the Maharlika Highway inside a 3.7-hectare government property in Barangay Isabang, Tayabas City in the province of Quezon. It was founded on 2011, admitting 80 students from all over the province who passed the Quezon Science High School Admission Test (QSHSAT) provided with complete scholarship offering free tuition fees, board and lodging, foods, uniforms, and other miscellaneous school fees.

History 
The building of the Quezon Science High School, which was constructed during Quezon Governor Rafael Nantes' administration, was originally intended to be a science museum but according to Governor David Suarez such plans were dropped due to fiercer competition from other museums based in Metro Manila. In 2010, Gloria Potes, Division of Quezon's then School Division Superintendent, made a suggestion to Suarez to convert the building to a science high school. The building was also planned to be converted to a call center facility but the plan likewise didn't push through due to lack of local manpower. The proposal was accepted since Quezon was the only province in the Calabarzon region not to have a science high school at that time. The school was inaugurated on August 17, 2011. QSHS held its first commencement ceremony last March 2015, having 71 students graduating. The first moving-up ceremony (having been influenced with the K-12 Educational Curriculum Program, which induces the Senior High School program

Sections 
As the 80 students are divided into two for each class to have 40 students each, they will be assigned to a section according to how well they did at the QSHAT (homogeneous, former way used) or they will be assigned randomly (heterogenous, current). In addition to the school's science relation where the education uses STEM–based curriculum (Science, Technology, English and Mathematics), the school uses stars as the name of the sections.
 Grade 7 - Pollux & Vega
 Grade 8 - Rigel & Altair
 Grade 9 - Polaris & Sirius
 Grade 10 - Betelgeuse & Antares
 Grade 11 - Andromeda & Auriga
 Grade 12 - Perseus & Orion

Facilities 
The school has facilities such as an E-library, two computer laboratories, a chemistry laboratory and a speech laboratory. It has six main classrooms, four on the second floor and the rest on the third. The first floor consists of the director's and secretary's offices, the chemistry lab, one of the two computer labs, the cafeteria, the activity area and the main faculty office (there are two more faculty offices, one in each of the higher floors). The second consists of the library, the speech lab and the other computer lab and the clinic. The third floor was a makeshift dormitory before the other one was erected, it has a wide space and is sometimes considered another activity area.

Dormitory 
It now has its own three-story dormitory, a project of Governor Suarez, boarding all the priority students from all over the province. The former dormitory is located at the third floor of the main building. It was officially opened in November 2014.

The Garden of Knowledge 
On August 10, 2015, the Garden of Knowledge was inaugurated and blessed. It features plants, some only found in Quezon Province, essential for the students knowledge in Agricultural Science. It was a project by Governor Suarez once again, alongside his wife.

Senior High School 
Senior High in Quezon Science High School is closed to outsiders; meaning only students who passed the QSHSAT and studied in QSHS starting Grade 7 are allowed to take SHS in QSHS. In the beginning of SY 2016–2017, QSHS formally implemented Senior High School with the STEM (Science, Technology, Engineering, and Mathematics) Academic Strand for its first batch of Grade 11 students. By SY 2017–2018, the number of students have increased.

References 

Science high schools in the Philippines
Educational institutions established in 2011
High schools in Quezon
Tayabas
2011 establishments in the Philippines